Argo was a French Navy  of the M6 ​​series commissioned in 1933. She participated in World War II, first on the side of the Allies from 1939 to June 1940, then in the navy of Vichy France until November 1942, and finally in the Free French Naval Forces through the end of the war.

Characteristics

Argo was part of a fairly homogeneous series of 31 deep-sea patrol submarines also called "1,500-tonners" because of their displacement. All entered service between 1931 and 1939.

They displaced  on the surface and  underwater. When submerged, their two electric motors produced a combined  and allowed them to reach .

Construction and commissioning

Laid down at Chantiers Dubigeon in Nantes, France, on 25 August 1927 with the hull number Q151, Argo was launched on 11 April 1929. She was commissioned on 12 February 1933.

Service history

World War II

French Navy
At the start of World War II in September 1939, Argo was assigned to the 4th Submarine Division based in Brest, France.

Part of the German merchant fleet — which the Allies suspected of serving as supply ships for German U-boats – took refuge in both the Azores and the Canary Islands at the start of the war, and on either 3 or 19 September 1939, according to different sources, Argo and Le Centaure began patrols off the Azores and the Canary Islands in search of German submarines and their supply ships. On 6 February 1940, the 4th Submarine Division was reassigned to Casablanca in French Morocco. In April 1940, Argo became part of the 4th Submarine Flotilla, based at Bizerte in Tunisia.

German ground forces advanced into France on 10 May 1940, beginning the Battle of France, and Italy declared war on France on 10 June 1940 and joined the invasion. On 25 June 1940, the Battle of France ended in France's defeat and an armistice with Germany and Italy that went into effect that day.

Vichy France
After the French surrender, Argo served in the naval forces of Vichy France. On 12 March 1942 she returned to Casablanca. During operations off the coast of French Morocco, she called at Safi from 28 March to 2 April 1942 and with Le Centaure at Mogador from 5 to 7 May 1942. She ran aground in fog while entering port at Casablanca on 5 July 1942 and suffered hull damage that kept her out of service for several weeks while undergoing repairs.

In August 1942, Argo transferred to French West Africa, departing Casablanca on 10 August 1942 in company with Le Centaure and their sister ship  and arriving on 16 August 1942 at Dakar in Senegal, where the three submarines formed the 3rd Submarine Division. By 9 November 1942, she was part of the French West Africa Submarine Group.

Free French Naval Forces
After Allied forces landed in French North Africa in Operation Torch in November 1942, Argo joined the Free French Naval Forces. However, she was deemed too worn-out for a complete overhaul, and these plans were cancelled. Instead, she was assigned along with Le Centaure to the sound school at Freetown, Sierra Leone, where the two submarines took part in antisubmarine warfare training for British warships, serving as training targets.

In September 1943 Argo was detached to the United States Navy′s sound schools, first at Bermuda, then at New London, Connecticut, and later at Key West, Florida. Although far from the combat zone, sound-school operations were very wearing on the French crews and their equipment, requiring the submarines to operate at sea 23 days per month as training targets.

After Germany surrendered on 8 May 1945, the need for antisubmarine warfare training in the Atlantic dropped sharply, and French submarines operating at U.S. Navy sound schools soon were soon returned to French operational control. They departed U.S. ports for bases in French North Africa in July 1945. World War II ended with the surrender of Japan on 2 September 1945, and Argo was disarmed on 26 April 1946.

References

Citations

Bibliography

 
 
 
 

Redoutable-class submarines (1928)
1929 ships
Ships built by Chantiers Dubigeon
World War II submarines of France
Submarines of the Free French Naval Forces
Maritime incidents in July 1942
Maritime incidents in April 1945